Karpe (formerly Karpe Diem) is a Norwegian rap duo.

Karpe may also refer to:
 Karpe fig, Ficus pleurocarpa
 Franz Samuel Karpe (1747–1806), a Slovenian philosopher

See also